Meiseners Section is a community in the Lunenburg Municipal District in Lunenburg County, Nova Scotia, Canada.

References
Meiseners Section on Destination Nova Scotia

Communities in Lunenburg County, Nova Scotia
General Service Areas in Nova Scotia